Henrico County Public Library system serves the county of Henrico, Virginia. The library system is within Region 4 of the Virginia Library Association (VLA). Henrico County Public Library System has eleven locations. The library branches house over 600 computers for public usage.

Service area 
According to the FY 2014 Institute of Museum and Library Services Data Catalog, the Library System has a service area population of 310,742 with 0 central library and 10 branch libraries.

History
Henrico County Public Library System was created in 1963 through the Henrico County Board of Supervisors and a citizens' committee. The library system was granted three area libraries: Fairfield, Lakeside, and Tuckahoe. Two branch libraries were also set up Varina and Sandston. In 1966, the Henrico County Free Library System was established. The name was changed to Henrico County Public libraries in 1967. By 1998, all buildings had public library access. In 1999, classes were created to teach community patrons how to use computers and access the Internet. Henrico County Public Library and Henrico County Public Schools partnered to provide students with access to students' school networks as well as library networks.

Branches 
 Fairfield Area Library established 1976 
 Gayton Branch Library established 1988 
 Glen Allen Branch Library established 1995 
 Libbie Mill Library established 2015 
 Municipal Government & Law Library established 1977
 North Park Branch Library established 2001 
 Sandston Branch Library established in 1980 on the grounds of the location of the first Henrico Library (1923-1980) 
 Tuckahoe Library established 1971, current location was built in 2006 
 Twin Hickory Area Library established 2007, replaced the Innsbrook Branch that was established in 1992.
 Varina Area Library established 2016 
 Mobile Library Service started in 1977, most current model from 2012

Services 
 Book Borrowing 
 Computer and Wifi Access
 Wireless Printing
 Librarians for assistance 
 Research Databases
 Interlibrary Loan
 Meeting Rooms

References

External links

Public libraries in Virginia
Education in Henrico County, Virginia
Libraries established in 1963
1963 establishments in Virginia